Star Trek: The Next Generation Officer's Manual is a supplement published by FASA in 1988 for Star Trek: The Role Playing Game to update game material following the premiere of the new television series Star Trek: The Next Generation. However Paramount Pictures did not feel FASA's new material matched the ethos of the new series, and pulled FASA's license to produce Star Trek material the following year.

Contents
Up until 1987, FASA's popular Star Trek: The Role Playing Game was based on the original Star Trek television series and movies produced up to that time. The television series Star Trek: The Next Generation first aired in September 1987, and provided many updates to the original Star Trek, including new uniforms, alien races, weapons, technology and a new appearance for Klingons.

Star Trek: The Next Generation Officer's Manual is a supplement that adds material from new series to the role-playing game, describing the Federation and Starfleet during the time period in which Star Trek: The Next Generation is set.

Publication history
Star Trek: The Next Generation Officer's Manual was written by Rick Stuart and John Terra, and was published by FASA Corp. in 1988 as a 144-page book.

Shannon Appelcline explains that "Star Trek [the role-playing game] had been doing well — with 1985 and 1986 being banner years for the product line. However in 1987 something happened to shake up FASA's franchise: Star Trek: The Next Generation (1987–1994) came on the air. For the first time since FASA had started publishing the Star Trek RPG, there were new Star Trek shows airing regularly. FASA slowed down their production of material set in the classic period, but that was soon balanced by new material for The Next Generation, including an Officer's Manual (1988) and First Year Sourcebook (1989). Unfortunately, the new show also made Paramount much pickier about what was being published, and they weren't entirely happy with FASA's two Next Generation supplements, which they felt didn't match their view of the Next Generation universe. In 1989 Paramount pulled FASA's license for Star Trek."

Reception
In the August 1989 edition of Dragon (Issue 148), Jim Bambra gave a recommendation for this book, saying, "Updating the Star Trek game to include information from the new television series is made easy with this book, and devourers of trivia will be kept pleasantly engaged."

Reviews
White Wolf #13 (Dec., 1988)

References

Role-playing game supplements introduced in 1988
Star Trek: The Role Playing Game supplements